Vladimirovo may refer to:

Bulgaria
 Vladimirovo, Dobrich Province, in Dobrichka municipality
 Vladimirovo, Haskovo Province, in Topolovgrad municipality
 Vladimirovo, Montana Province, in Boychinovtsi municipality
North Macedonia
 Vladimirovo, Berovo